Little Songs is the debut solo album by Canadian rock band, Moist's, frontman David Usher. It was released on March 17, 1998 via EMI Music Canada label. Three singles, "Forestfire", "Jesus Was My Girl", and "St Lawrence River" were also released off the record.

Track listing

References

External links

1998 debut albums
David Usher albums
EMI Records albums